George Besson (25 December 1882 – 19 June 1971) was a French art critic, and the founder and director of Cahiers d'Aujourd'hui. His wife Adèle was the subject of Pierre-Auguste Renoir's Portrait of Adèle Besson.

In 1971 the Bessons donated their art collection to the French state, the musée de Besançon and the musée Albert-André in Bagnols-sur-Cèze.

French art critics
1882 births
1971 deaths
French male writers
20th-century French male writers